SMRT may refer to:

Medicine
 Silencing mediator for retinoid and thyroid-hormone receptor
 Single Molecule Real Time Sequencing, a parallelized DNA sequencing by synthesis technology

Transport
 SMRT Corporation, a Singaporean public transport operator
 SMRT Trains, their rail subsidiary
 SMRT Buses, their bus subsidiary
 Scenic Mississippi Regional Transit, a regional bus system in Wisconsin, USA
 Seoul Metropolitan Rapid Transit Corporation, a South Korean subway operator
 Southern Maryland Rapid Transit, a proposed American light-rail system

Other uses
 St Mary Redcliffe and Temple School, a school located at Redcliffe, Bristol
 Thomas J. Smrt (born 1928), American inventor
 Homer Simpson's spelling of Smart in The Simpsons episode "Homer Goes to College"